In the visual arts, shape is a flat, enclosed area of an artwork created through lines, textures, or colours, or an area enclosed by other shapes, such as triangles, circles, and squares. Likewise, a form can refer to a three-dimensional composition or object within a three-dimensional composition.

Specifically, it is an enclosed space, the boundaries of which are defined by other elements of art. Shapes are limited to two dimensions: length and width.

Form 
A form is an artist's way of using elements of art, principles of design, and media. Form as an element of art is three-dimensional and encloses space. Like a shape, a form has length and width, but it also has depth. Forms are either geometric or free-form.

Categories

Geometric and organic
Geometric shapes are precise edged and mathematically consistent curves, they are pure forms and so consist of circles, squares, spirals, triangles, while geometric forms are simple volumes, such as cubes, cylinders, and pyramids. They generally dominate architecture, technology, industry and crystalline structures.

In contrast, organic shapes are free-form, unpredictable, and flowing in appearance. These shapes and organic forms visually suggest the natural world of animals, plants, sky, sea, etc... The addition of organic shapes to a composition dominated by geometric structures can add unpredictable energy.

Positive and negative
A positive shape is a shape, that has details inside it, such as an outline of a human, with body features. Contrarily, a negative shape is a shape without any details; it's just an outline.

Representation
A shape that is representative is created by the flattening out of three-dimensional objects.  Nothing is actually geometric, but can be interpreted as such by breaking it down to shapes that, when put together, form a recognizable silhouette.

See also
Elements of art
Composition (visual arts)
Design elements and principles

References

Further reading
 Gatto, Porter, and Selleck. Exploring Visual Design: The Elements and Principles. 3rd ed. Worcester: Davis Publications, Inc., 2000.

External links
 Basic 2D Vocabulary

Artistic techniques
Photographic techniques
Sculpture techniques